Zavitinsk is a town and the administrative center of Zavitinsky District in Amur Oblast, Russia. Population:

Administrative and municipal status
Within the framework of administrative divisions, Zavitinsk serves as the administrative center of Zavitinsky District. As an administrative division, it is, together with three rural localities, incorporated within Zavitinsky District as Zavitinsk Urban Settlement. As a municipal division, this administrative unit also has urban settlement status and is a part of Zavitinsky Municipal District.

Military

References

Notes

Sources

Cities and towns in Amur Oblast
Amur Oblast (Russian Empire)